Traditional East Asian age reckoning covers a group of related methods for reckoning human ages practiced in the East Asian cultural sphere, characterized by counting inclusively from 1 at birth and increasing at each New Year instead of each birthday. Ages calculated this way are always 1 or 2 years greater than those calculated solely by birthdays. Historical records from China, Japan, Korea, and Vietnam have usually been based on these methods, whose specific details have varied over time and by place. Two forms are still used in South Korea in some official contexts, although this is scheduled to end in June 2023. Informal use is still widespread in the Republic and People's Republic of China, North and South Korea, Singapore, and the overseas Chinese and Korean diasporas. 

Chinese age reckoning, the first of these methods, originated from the belief in ancient Chinese astrology that one's fate is bound to the stars imagined to be in opposition to the planet Jupiter at the time of one's birth. The importance of this duodecennial cycle is also essential to fengshui geomancy but only survives in popular culture as the 12 animals of the Chinese zodiac, whichlike the starschange each Chinese New Year. In this system, one's age is not a calculation of the number of calendar years (nián) since birth but a count of the number of these Jovian stars   suì) whose influence one has lived through. By the Song dynasty, this systemand the extra importance of the sixtieth birthday produced by its combination with the sexagenary cyclehad spread throughout the Sinosphere. Japan eliminated their version of this system as part of the Meiji Reforms. The Republic of China partially modernized the system during their own reforms, which were continued by the Communists after the Chinese Civil War. Modern Taiwan now has a mixed system, with very widespread use of traditional ages sometimes accommodated by the government. On the mainland, despite calculating age solely by birthdays for all official purposes, Standard Mandarin continues to exclusively use the word suì for talking about years of age; Japanese similarly uses its equivalent, sai.

Korean age reckoning began by using the Chinese system but changed to calculating ages using January 1st as the New Year with their adoption of the Gregorian calendar in 1896. In North Korea, the old system was eliminated entirely in the 1980s. In South Korea, the international "actual ages" have gradually supplanted "Korean ages" in many contexts such as eligibility for driving or access to alcohol and tobacco. A third intermediate system is also used by some South Korean laws. This "year age" is difference between one's birth year and the current year, equivalent to calculating ages using January 1st but starting at 0 instead of 1. This mixed system produced difficulties scheduling vaccination for COVID-19 effectively, and the government has announced that it will fully convert to calculating ages only by birthdays beginning in June 2023.

China

Mainland

In pre-modern times, sui was calculated from the time of birth. A person was one sui as soon as they were born. At the Lunar new year, they turned two sui, and every subsequent new year after that, they were one more sui. Thus, by traditional reckoning, sui does not exactly mean "years old".

Currently in China and in Chinese societies around the world, the term sui when used all by itself can be ambiguous. In most contexts, such as the age on legal documents, it is equivalent to the English "years old." Thus, in China, where the legal age of alcohol consumption is 18 sui, one is not legally permitted to drink alcohol until after their 18th birthday. However, in some contexts, such as in determining age for fortune-telling purposes, or in reading pre-modern texts, one must distinguish between the traditional way of calculating age and the modern way adopted from the West. 

In many Chinese societies around the world, a child's horoscope is calculated at birth and is considered relevant throughout their life. The horoscope is calculated using the traditional sui (虛歲/虚岁 xusui or 毛歲/毛岁 maosui). This becomes important, for example in calculating a person's fan tai sui 反太歲/反太岁, which occurs after every twelve-year zodiac cycle. Thus, for a child born in June of the year 2000, a year of the dragon, the first fan tai sui year would occur in the next dragon year, which would begin on Lunar new year in the year 2012, when the child turns 13 sui. By modern reckoning, the child would be 11 years old at the beginning of the year and turn 12 years old in June. Therefore, the modern way of reckoning age does not correspond to the horoscope. Using the traditional reckoning, the child in the example is 13 sui for the entirety of the fan tai sui year.   

If one needs to distinguish the Western adopted terminology that is in general use now, xu sui is contrasted with shi sui 實歲/实岁 (or zhou sui 周嵗/周岁), but outside of astrological uses, the need for such a contrast today is rare. One must be careful, however, when calculating ages in pre-modern times. A figure listed as 69 sui during the Song dynasty, for example, would not be 69 years old and would instead be either 67 or 68. The exact age, by modern reckoning, would be impossible to know just from the sui alone, without knowing the actual year of birth by the Gregorian calendar.

When a child has survived one month of life (29 days, if using Lunar month reckoning), a mun yuet celebration can be observed, in which duck or chicken eggs dyed red are distributed to guests to signify fertility.

Taiwan
East Asian age reckoning, both linguistically and in practice, follows the example of China (see ) as the vast majority of Taiwanese people are ethnically Chinese. Unlike the Chinese however, the Taiwanese more widely use the East Asian age reckoning in a variety of social contexts and the term sui less ambiguously refers to ones age according to this system. While birthdays are increasingly celebrated according to the Gregorian calendar, the traditional age reckoning is retained (e.g. Su Beng's centennial was celebrated to honor his November 5th, 1918 birth in the Gregorian calendar in 2017, not 2018).  Furthermore, Taiwanese, like South Koreans, do not add a year to their age on their birthdays but on New Year's Day (in the case of Taiwan, on the Lunisolar Chinese calendar New Year and not the Gregorian one as in Korea).

Korea 

Koreans who use the traditional system refer to their age in units called sal (살), using Korean numerals in ordinal form. Thus, a person is one sal (han sal []) during the first calendar year of life, and ten sal during the tenth calendar year. Sal is used for native Korean numerals, while se (세; 歲) is used for Sino-Korean. For example, seumul-daseot sal and i-sib-o se both mean 'twenty-five-year-old'. If the international system is used (man-nai []), then the age would be man seumul-daseot sal. South Koreans speaking of age in the colloquial context will almost without question be referring to the traditional system, unless the man qualifier is used.

The 100th day after a baby was born is called  which literally means "a hundred days" in Korean, and is given a special celebration, marking the survival of what was once a period of high infant mortality. The first anniversary of birth named dol is likewise celebrated, and given even greater significance. South Koreans celebrate their birthdays, even though every South Korean gains one sal on New Year's Day. Because the first year comes at birth and the second on the first day of the New Year, children born, for example, on December 31 are considered to become two-year-olds the very next day, New Year's Day (of the Gregorian, not the Korean calendar).

Hence, everyone born on the same calendar year effectively has the same age and can easily be calculated by the formula: Age = (Current Year − Birth Year) + 1

In modern South Korea the traditional system is used alongside the international age system which is referred to as man-nai in which "man" means "full" or "actual", and nai meaning "age". For example,  means "full ten years", or "ten years old" in English. The Korean word  means "years elapsed", identical to the English "years old", but is only used to refer to the first few birthdays.  or simply  refers to the first Gregorian-equivalent birthday,  refers to the second, and so on.

The traditional system has not been used in modern North Korea since the 1980s.

In the past, most people used the Lunar calendar to tell their birthdays rather than the Gregorian calendar, but nowadays Koreans, especially young generations, tend to use  for telling their birth dates.

For official government uses, documents, and legal procedures, the international system is used. Regulations regarding age limits on beginning school, as well as the age of consent, are all based on this system (man-nai). The age qualifier for tobacco and alcohol use is actually similar to, but distinct from the East Asian reckoning system. A person is allowed tobacco and alcohol if it is after January 1 of the year one turns 19 (post-birth age). This is the "year age", which is basically (Korean age – 1), or when a person's Korean age is 20.

Calls to remove the system intensified in early 2022 due to the COVID-19 pandemic, as inconsistent use of the two age systems created conflicts in the eligibility criteria for COVID-19 vaccines and a vaccine passport rule; some residents were being deemed ineligible for vaccination, but at the same time subject to a proof of vaccination requirement for certain establishments. In April 2022, the transition committee of president-elect Yoon Suk-yeol stated that the government planned to amend the Civil Code and other relevant legislation to switch to the standard international age system. On 8 December 2022, the National Assembly passed a bill that would prohibit the usage of traditional ages on official documents effective June 2023.

Japan
However, the traditional system was still commonly used, so in 1950 another law was established to encourage people to use the modern age system.

Today the traditional system is used only by the elderly and in rural areas. Elsewhere its use is limited to traditional ceremonies, divinations, and obituaries.

Japanese uses the word sai ( or ) as a counter word for both the traditional and modern age system.

Because of the idea of yakudoshi or unlucky years, kanreki is a special occurrence for celebrating 60 years of life, meaning one has returned to the same combination of zodiacal symbols that governed the year of one's birth.

Mongolia
Eastern Mongolia has a different system for measuring a person's age, which is based on the number of lunar cycles that have passed (since birth for boys; girls are measured from conception).

Vietnam
Having been influenced by Chinese culture, the ancient Vietnamese also used this system and, despite not being the official age on papers and in daily usages at the present, the East Asian age is still in limited use by adults, especially old people in rural areas. However, this age system is not really familiar to the younger generation.

See also

 Chinese calendar
 Japanese calendar
 Korean calendar
 Republic of China calendar
 Vietnamese calendar

Citations

General and cited references

External links
 Japanese kazoedoshi counting

Age and society
Chinese culture
Japanese culture
Korean culture
Vietnamese culture